Broad Left Front can refer to:

 Broad Left Front (Ecuador)
 Broad Left Front (Guatemala)
 Broad Left Front (Peru)